Simon is an album by Gruvis Malt. It was released by Integers Only, an independent self-run label managed by Gruvis Malt founder Gavin Castleton, in 2004.

Track listing
"Ark" - 4:16
"A Great Work of Fiction" - 7:16
"What Ladder?" - 2:06
"Safety Train" - 3:56
"The Fists of Protocol" - 3:32
"Water Closet" - 4:26
"Some Sweet Nothingness" - 3:16
"B612" - 4:16
"The Heart Transplant You Can Afford" - 4:11
"Exit Strategy" - 4:32

See also
Gavin Castleton
Album Maximum Unicorn
Album Sound Soldiers
Album Cromagnetic
Album ...With the Spirit of a Traffic Jam...

References 

Gruvis Malt albums
2004 albums